Tettenweis is a municipality in the district of Passau in Bavaria, Germany.

References

Passau (district)